This is a list of places in Chile with reduplicated names, often as a result of the grammatical rules of the Mapuche language from which many of the names derive. It is common for reduplicated Mapuche words to have suffixes.

Place names
 Bío Bío River, Biobío and Araucanía regions
 Calle-Calle River, Los Ríos Region
 Caucau River, Los Ríos Region
 Chan-Chan, Los Ríos Region
 Chan Chan (forest), Los Lagos and Los Ríos regions
 Chan Chan Airport, Los Ríos Region
 Chinchin River, Los Lagos Region
 Chiu Chiu, Antofagasta Region
 Cholchol, Araucanía Region
 Cholchol River, Araucanía Region
 Concón, Valparaíso Region
 Cuz Cuz, Coquimbo Region
 Golgol River, Los Lagos Region
 Huilo-Huilo Falls, Los Ríos Region
 Estero Huiñahuiña, Los Ríos Region
 Estero Lipelipe, Biobío Region
 Fundo Chan Chan, Los Ríos Region 
 Llay-Llay, Valparaíso Region
 Estero Llay-Llay, Los Lagos Region
 Estero Llaullau, Araucanía Region
 Lleulleu Lake, Biobío Region
 Lleulleu River, Biobío and Araucanía regions
 Estero Lliu-Lliu, Valparaíso Region
 Marga Marga, Valparaíso Region
 Pille Cozcoz River, Los Ríos Region
 Estero Quilquilco, Biobío and Araucanía regions
 Taltal, Antofagasta Region
 Temucuicui, Araucanía Region
 Tiltil, Santiago Metropolitan Region
 Estero de Trapa Trapa, Biobío Region
 Estero Truftruf, Araucanía Region
 Estero Trentren, Araucanía Region
 Estero Traitraico, Araucanía Region

See also
List of reduplicated place names
List of reduplicated Australian place names
List of reduplicated New Zealand place names

References

Sources
Palabras repetidas (in Spanish)

Chile
Reduplicated
Chilean repeated
Mapuche language
Chile